was a Japanese politician who served as governor of Fukui Prefecture (1907-1912) and Hiroshima Prefecture from March 1912 to February 1913.

Governors of Hiroshima
1853 births
1947 deaths
Japanese Home Ministry government officials
Governors of Fukui Prefecture